The 2017 County Championship (known for sponsorship reasons as the 2017 Specsavers County Championship), was the 118th cricket County Championship season. It was announced in March 2016 that the season would feature eight teams in Division One and ten teams in Division Two, meaning that at the end of the 2016 season only one team was promoted from Division Two whilst two were relegated from Division One. The first round of fixtures began on 7 April, with the final matches completed on 28 September. All of the fixtures starting on 26 June 2017 were played as day/night matches.

Following a series of financial "bailout" payments made by the England and Wales Cricket Board to Durham during the 2016 season, the county, which had finished fourth in Division One at the end of the season, were relegated to Division Two in place of the eighth place team, Hampshire. Durham were also placed under a salary cap administered by the ECB until 2020 and started the 2017 Championship season with a deduction of 48 points. Ahead of the season, each team played a first-class match against a MCC University team.

Teams 
The 2017 Championship was divided into two divisions, Division One with eight teams, Division Two with 10 teams.

Teams in both divisions played a total of 14 games, with all Division One teams playing each other twice, while Division Two teams played five counties twice and four once.

Division One 
 Team promoted from Division Two

Division Two 
 Team relegated from Division One

Standings 
Teams received 16 points for a win, 8 for a tie and 5 for a draw. Bonus points (a maximum of 5 batting points and 3 bowling points) could be scored during the first 110 overs of each team's first innings.

Division One

Division Two

Fixtures 
The fixture list for the 2017 season was announced in November 2016.

Division One

April

May

June

July

August

September

Division Two

April

May

June

July

August

September

Statistics

Division One

Most runs

Most wickets

Division Two

Most runs

Most wickets

References 

2017
County Championship